Eophyllites is a genus of ammonoid cephalopods from the Lower Triassic and a predecessor of genera like Monophyllites and Ussurites.

The shell of Eophyllites is evolute, discoidal; whorls compressed, deeply embracing;  flanks gently convex, converging on a narrowly rounded venter. Sutures basically ceratitic; ventral lobe wide, divided by a high siphonal saddle; Lobesjagged, 1st lateral larger than the second; saddles monophyllic, smooth and rounded.

Related Palaeophyllites from the same age is ribbed on the outer flanks and lobes in the suture are more terminally digitate.

References 

 W.J. Arkell, et al., 1957. Mesozoic Ammonoidea, Treatise on Invertebrate Paleontology, Part L. Geological Society of America and University of Kansas Press
 Sepkoski's list of Cephalopod Genera

Ammonitida genera
Triassic ammonites
Triassic animals of Asia